Patrick George Wilson (born February 1, 1969) is an American musician, singer, and songwriter. He is best known as the drummer and co-founding member of the rock band Weezer, with whom he has recorded fifteen studio albums.

In addition to his work in Weezer, Wilson also fronts his own band, The Special Goodness.

Career

Early life
Patrick Wilson was born in Buffalo, New York, on February 1, 1969, and raised in nearby Clarence. He was introduced to music very early on in his life, making his first musical purchase of Barry Manilow's 1976 album This One's for You. Shortly after his fifteenth birthday he went to his first concert, seeing Van Halen. As a result, he was inspired to start taking drum lessons. By his senior year at Clarence High School, Wilson and his friend Greg Czarnecki began teaching the instrument, eventually amassing over 30 students.

After graduating from high school in 1987, Wilson attended a local college briefly, dropping out after one semester. He commented, "College is such bunk. Too much politics and jockeying for favor. I just couldn't do it. College is great if you want to learn, but that's not what college is about, it's about making your professor happy and getting good grades and getting into IBM. Any place that says that they're only accepting college graduates is not a place I'm very interested in being."

Growing tired of the local music scene, and at the urging of friend Patrick Finn, Wilson moved to Los Angeles at the age of 21. Shortly after arriving in Los Angeles, he joined the short-lived band Bush (not Gavin Rossdale's Bush) While in Bush, Wilson met future Weezer bass player Matt Sharp, with whom he developed a friendship. Eventually by the spring of 1991, Wilson started a band with Patrick Finn, and later Jason Cropper called Sixty Wrong Sausages.

Meanwhile, Wilson was also in another band with future Weezer frontman Rivers Cuomo called Fuzz, which dissolved within three months. "By the time I had met Matt Sharp, and we were trying to figure out something to do. We had a lot of passion and interested in certain kinds of music, but we didn't know how that was going to translate into what we were going to do. So we met Rivers – 'He's got an 8-track, let's get with him' – and we convinced him to move into this apartment with us. Rivers was just starting to write songs and he asked me to play drums on a song for him. That turned into a band called Fuzz, with this girl bass player. That was pretty cool, but it had to die."

In the spring of 1991, Sharp moved north to Berkeley to pursue what Karl Koch called, "some sorta symphonic keyboard sequencing music." Other members of the band moved to separate apartments. During this time, Wilson performed in a number of different bands, such as The Dum Dums and United Dirt. Eventually Cuomo, Wilson, and Cropper would reunite in a band called Sixty Wrong Sausages with Patrick Finn. Later, after Sixty Wrong Sausages broke up in late 1991, Matt Sharp would end up replacing Finn. During this time, Wilson and Cuomo embarked on the "50 song project" in which they would dedicate themselves to writing 50 new songs. Out of this project, future Weezer songs would be created such as "Undone—The Sweater Song," "My Name Is Jonas," "Lullaby For Wayne," and "The World Has Turned and Left Me Here."

In January 1992, Sharp reconnected with his former bandmates Cuomo, Wilson, and Cropper, and Wilson showed him material from his and Cuomo's "50 song project." Sharp was pleased with the material and returned to Los Angeles to join the band, consisting of Rivers Cuomo, Patrick Wilson, and Jason Cropper, now under the name Weezer.

With Weezer
In addition to his drum duties, Wilson has three song co-writing credits on Weezer songs – "The World has Turned and Left Me Here," "Surf Wax America," "My Name is Jonas" – and solo writing credits on "Automatic" and "In the Mall." He also has lead vocal/lead guitar duties on "Automatic." However, Rivers Cuomo and Pat Wilson have written far more songs collaboratively including "Lemonade" (released on Alone: The Home Recordings of Rivers Cuomo) and "Lullaby For Wayne" (released on the deluxe version of The Blue Album).

In the past, Wilson's amusing stunts on skateboards, scooters, and bicycles have been video taped and released on Weezer's official website. Some of these videos can be seen on Weezer's DVD, Video Capture Device, released in 2004. Wilson can be seen playing guitar for Weezer when they play acoustic versions of songs on tour; in 2005 during the Foozer tour (with Foo Fighters), Wilson played lead guitar and sang for the song "Photograph," which was always followed by him leading a cover of Blur's "Song 2."

Wilson wrote and performed lead vocals/guitars on "Automatic," on Weezer's third self-titled album. The song was remixed by LA Riots for the video game Gran Turismo 5 Prologue. Wilson also sang lead vocals on Red Album b-sides "Life's What You Make It" (a Talk Talk cover), a cover of "Love My Way" by The Psychedelic Furs, and lead vocals in parts of Weezer's cover of Gary Numan's "Are 'Friends' Electric?," which he had sung live with Weezer in 2005.

On Weezer's 2008 Troublemaker tour, Wilson played drums and sang lead vocals first on a three part lead vocal with Scott Shriner and Rivers Cuomo on "My Name is Jonas"; sang lead vocals and played lead guitar on "Automatic" and covers of Nirvana's "Sliver," Oasis's "Morning Glory," and Pink Floyd's "Time"; and played drums and sings back-up vocals on "The Greatest Man That Ever Lived."

On Weezer's 2009 tour supporting Blink 182, Josh Freese played drums for Weezer while Wilson played guitar for 90% of their set. Rivers Cuomo insisted that he wanted to be more interactive and mobile on stage, so Wilson took up his responsibility of guitar and only played drums on songs that didn't require multiple guitar parts.

Other projects
Wilson records and performs with his own band, The Special Goodness, for which he writes songs, performs vocals, and plays the majority of the instruments. The band has released several albums, and Wilson himself has made songs available on his website in the past.

Almost immediately after Weezer's initial success, Wilson played drums on The Rentals' first record Return of the Rentals but never toured with the band.

Wilson and Weezer guitarist Brian Bell collaborated on a cover of the Velvet Underground song "Heroin" for the 2006 film Factory Girl. Additionally, Wilson and Bell were given small roles in the film as John Cale and Lou Reed, respectively.

Wilson has been an Executive Producer for the No Agenda podcast.

Personal life
Wilson married Jennifer Wilson in 1994 and they had two sons, Charlie, born in 2004, and Ian Patrick, born in early 2008. Jennifer died following a battle with cancer in August 2013. Patrick remarried in February 2015, to Camille Wilson. They had a son, Cruz, born in 2016. They live in Southern California. Patrick also participated in episode 82 of MacBreak Weekly, Leo Laporte's Weekly Mac Podcast.

Discography

With Weezer

 1994 – Weezer (Blue Album)
 1996 – Pinkerton
 2001 – Weezer (Green Album)
 2002 – Maladroit
 2005 – Make Believe
 2008 – Weezer (Red Album)
 2009 – Raditude
 2010 – Hurley
 2010 – Death to False Metal
 2014 – Everything Will Be Alright in the End
 2016 – Weezer (White Album)
 2017 – Pacific Daydream
 2019 – Weezer (Teal Album)
 2019 – Weezer (Black Album)
 2021 – OK Human
 2021 – Van Weezer
 2022 - SZNZ: Spring
 2022 - SZNZ: Summer
 2022 - SZNZ: Autumn
 2022 - SZNZ: Winter

With The Special Goodness
 1998 – Special Goodness (aka "The Bunny Record")
 2001 – At Some Point, Birds and Flowers Became Interesting (aka "Pinecone")
 2003 – Land Air Sea
 2012 – Natural

With The Rentals
 1995 – Return of the Rentals

With Rivers Cuomo
 2007 – Alone: The Home Recordings of Rivers Cuomo (co-wrote and plays drums on "Lemonade")

With Homie
 1998 – Meet the Deedles Soundtrack (plays drums on "American Girls")

Pat has also sung background vocals on Rancid's album, Let the Dominoes Fall.

References

External links
 Patrick Wilson – Biography
 

1969 births
Living people
American rock drummers
Musicians from Buffalo, New York
People from Canyon Lake, California
Weezer members
The Rentals members
People from Clarence, New York
Power pop musicians
20th-century American drummers
American male drummers